The 1916 United States Senate election in Maryland was held on November 7, 1916.

Incumbent Democratic Senator Blair Lee I ran for election to a full term in office, but was defeated in the Democratic primary by U.S. Representative David John Lewis. Lewis went on to lose the general election to Republican Joseph I. France, a professor of medicine and former State Senator.

Democratic primary

Candidates
 William Cabell Bruce, historian and former State Delegate
 Blair Lee I, incumbent Senator since 1913
 David John Lewis, U.S. Representative from Cumberland

Results

Lee received more raw votes than Lewis did, but Lewis received a higher share of the unit vote at the State Convention.

Republican primary

Candidates
 Joseph I. France, professor of medicine and former State Senator
 Phillips Lee Goldsborough, Governor of Maryland

Results

General election

Results

Results by county

Counties that flipped from Democrat to Republican
Baltimore (City)
Baltimore (County)
Cecil
Dorchester

Counties that flipped from Republican to Democrat
Washington

See also
1916 United States Senate elections
1916 United States elections

References

Notes

1916
Maryland
United States Senate